Johan de Kock (born 25 October 1964) is a Dutch former professional footballer who played as a centre-back. He earned 13 caps for the Netherlands national team, in which he scored one goal. He was a member of the Dutch team at UEFA Euro 1996 in England.

De Kock made his debut for the Netherlands on 24 February 1993 in the 3–1 win at the 1994 FIFA World Cup qualifying match against Turkey in Utrecht. He played for Groningen, Utrecht, Roda JC, and Schalke 04, with whom he won the UEFA Cup in 1997.

Unusually for a top level footballer, De Kock was a part-time player while representing the Netherlands at Euro 1996. He was employed as a road engineer at the time.

References

External links
 Johan de Kock at beijen.net 
 

1964 births
Living people
People from Sliedrecht
Association football central defenders
Dutch footballers
Netherlands international footballers
Eredivisie players
Bundesliga players
FC Schalke 04 players
FC Utrecht players
Roda JC Kerkrade players
FC Groningen players
Dutch expatriate footballers
Expatriate footballers in Germany
UEFA Euro 1996 players
UEFA Cup winning players
Footballers from South Holland